Vítor Manuel Rosa Martins (born 27 March 1950) is a Portuguese former footballer who played as a midfielder.

Club career
Born in Alcobaça, Leiria District, Martins spent his entire professional career with S.L. Benfica after joining the club's youth system at the age of 15. He was part of the squads that won six Primeira Liga championships in the 70s, scoring in his league debut on 1 December 1969 against U.F.C.I. Tomar (6–0 home win).

Martins was forced to retire at the age of only 29: after undergoing surgery for a meniscus injury two years earlier, he suffered an embolism. He continued to work with Benfica, as a scout.

International career
Martins earned three caps for Portugal over four months. One of them was a 0–0 UEFA Euro 1976 qualifier with England at Wembley Stadium, on 20 November 1974.

Honours
Primeira Liga: 1970–71, 1971–72, 1972–73, 1974–75, 1975–76, 1976–77

See also
List of one-club men

References

External links

1950 births
Living people
People from Alcobaça, Portugal
Sportspeople from Leiria District
Portuguese footballers
Association football midfielders
Primeira Liga players
S.L. Benfica footballers
Portugal youth international footballers
Portugal under-21 international footballers
Portugal international footballers